The 1975 Commercial Union Assurance Grand Prix was a professional tennis circuit administered by the International Lawn Tennis Federation (ILTF) which served as a forerunner to the current Association of Tennis Professionals (ATP) World Tour and the Women's Tennis Association (WTA) Tour. The circuit consisted of the four modern Grand Slam tournaments and open tournaments recognised by the ILTF. The Commercial Union Assurance Masters, Davis Cup Final and Nations Cup are included in this calendar but did not count towards the Grand Prix.

The men's schedule started in December 1974 with the Australian Open and continued in May 1975 following the conclusion of the rival 1975 World Championship Tennis circuit which ran from January to early May.

Schedule
Key

December 1974

January

February

May

June

July

August

September

October

November

December

Grand Prix points system
The tournaments listed above were divided into four groups. Group TC consisted of the Triple Crown – the French Open, the Wimbledon Championships and the US Open – while the other tournaments were divided into three other groups – AA, A and B – by prize money and draw size. Points were allocated based on these groups and the finishing position of a player in a tournament. No points were awarded to first round losers and ties were settled by the number of tournaments played. The points allocation – with doubles points listed in brackets – can be found below:

Standings

ATP rankings
These are the ATP rankings of the top twenty singles players at the end of the 1974 season and at the end of the 1975 season,   with numbers of ranking points, points averages, numbers of tournaments played, year-end rankings in 1975, highest and lowest positions during the season and number of spots gained or lost from the first rankings to the year-end rankings.

List of tournament winners
The list of winners and number of Grand Prix singles titles won, alphabetically by last number of titles:
 Manuel Orantes (6) Bournemouth, Hamburg, Båstad, Indianapolis, Montreal, US Open
 Guillermo Vilas (5) Munich, Hilversum, Washington, D.C., Louisville, Buenos Aires
 Arthur Ashe (3) Wimbledon, Los Angeles, San Francisco
 Björn Borg (3) French Open, Boston, Barcelona
 Ilie Năstase (3) Barcelona, South Orange, Masters
 Vijay Amritraj (2) Columbus, Calcutta
 Ross Case (2) Manila, Sydney Indoor
 Jimmy Connors (2) North Conway, Maui
 Tom Gorman (2) Cincinnati, Hong Kong
 Tom Okker (2) Nottingham, Paris (Jean Becker)
 Adriano Panatta (2) Kitzbühel, Stockholm
 Raúl Ramírez (2) Rome, Tokyo Outdoor
 Harold Solomon (2) Perth, Johannesburg
 Eddie Dibbs (1) Tehran
 Jaime Fillol (1) Düsseldorf
 Brian Gottfried (1) Melbourne Indoor
 Jan Kodeš (1) Madrid
 John Newcombe (1) Australian Open
 Ken Rosewall (1) Gstaad
 Stan Smith (1) Sydney Indoor

No players won their first Grand Prix title in 1975.

See also
 1975 World Championship Tennis circuit
 1975 USLTA-IPA Indoor Circuit
 1975 WTA Tour

Notes

References

External links
ATP Archive 1975: Commercial Union Grand Prix Tournaments
History Mens Professional Tours

Further reading

 
Grand Prix tennis circuit seasons
Grand Prix